2,5-Dimethoxy-4-butylamphetamine (DOBU) is a lesser-known psychedelic drug and a substituted Amphetamine. DOBU was first synthesized by Alexander Shulgin. In his book PiHKAL (Phenethylamines i Have Known And Loved), only low dosages of 2–3 mg were tested, with the duration simply listed as "very long". DOBU produces paresthesia and difficulty sleeping, but with few other effects. Compared to shorter chain homologues such as DOM, DOET and DOPR which are all potent hallucinogens, DOBU has an even stronger 5-HT2 binding affinity but fails to substitute for hallucinogens in animals or produce hallucinogenic effects in humans, suggesting it has low efficacy and is thus an antagonist or weak partial agonist at the 5-HT2A receptor.

Isomers
Alternative isomers of DOBU can also be produced, where the 4-(n-butyl) group of DOBU is replaced with any of the three other butyl isomers, the iso-butyl, sec-butyl and tert-butyl compounds being called DOIB, DOSB and DOTB respectively. All are significantly less potent than DOBU, with DOIB being active at around 10–15 mg, and DOSB at 25–30 mg, and both being primarily stimulant in action with little or no psychedelic effects. The most highly branched isomer DOTB was completely inactive in both animal and human trials.

See also 
 2,5-Dimethoxy-4-Substituted Amphetamines

References

External links 
 DOBU Entry in PiHKAL
 DOBU Entry in PiHKAL • info

Substituted amphetamines